The Tennessee Confederate Women's Monument, also known as the Tennessee Monument to the Women of the Confederacy or the Monument to Southern Women in War Times, is a bronze statue on the grounds of the Tennessee State Capitol in Nashville, Tennessee, USA.

Background
The monument was first suggested by Sumner Archibald Cunningham, the editor of Confederate Veteran, in 1894. However, once the design had been drawn, he objected to it, opining that it failed to convey "the divine qualities of southern womanhood." 

Edith Pope, the second editor of the Confederate Veteran and a leading member of the Nashville No. 1 chapter of the United Daughters of the Confederacy (later its president), played a key role in promoting the project. 

Fundraising came from the Sons of Confederate Veterans.

Description
The statue symbolizes women's role in helping the personnel who served in the Confederate States Army during the American Civil War. It was designed by Belle Kinney Scholz, who described it as:

Dedication
The dedication, held on October 10, 1926, took place inside the War Memorial Auditorium due to a downpour. It was attended by 800 people, including Governor Austin Peay, members of the United Confederate Veterans, the Sons of Confederate Veterans and the United Daughters of the Confederacy, including the president of its Tennessee chapter, Mary Lou Gordon White. Reverend James I. Vance, the pastor of the First Presbyterian Church, "delivered the invocation."

References

1926 establishments in Tennessee
1926 sculptures
Bronze sculptures in Tennessee
Buildings and structures in Nashville, Tennessee
Confederate States of America monuments and memorials in Tennessee
Sculptures of women in Tennessee
Statues in Tennessee
Outdoor sculptures in Tennessee
Monuments and memorials to women
Women in Tennessee